Sir Henry Belasyse, 1st Baronet (1555–1624) was an English politician.

Origins
He was the son of Sir William Bellasis (d.1604) of Newburgh Priory in Yorkshire.

Career
He was educated at Jesus College, Cambridge. He succeeded his father in 1604 and was created a baronet "of Newborough" in 1611.

He was a Justice of the Peace for the North Riding of Yorkshire c. 1586–7, c. 1594–6 and from 1601 to his death in 1624 and was also a member of the Council of the North from 1603 till death. He was appointed Sheriff of Yorkshire for 1603–04.

He was elected as a Member of Parliament for Thirsk in 1586, 1589 and 1593. After sitting for Aldborough from 1597 to 1601 he was again elected for Thirsk in 1601.

Marriage and children
He married Ursula Fairfax, a daughter of Sir Thomas Fairfax of Denton, Yorkshire, by whom he had one son and at least one daughter:
Thomas Belasyse, 1st Viscount Fauconberg, 1st Baron Fauconberg, 2nd Baronet (1577–1652), son and heir, in 1627 created Baron Fauconberg and in 1643 created Viscount Fauconberg "of Henknowle".
Dorothy Belasyse, who married Conyers Darcy, 7th Baron Darcy de Knayth and whose daughter Mary Darcy married Sir William Lister.

Death and burial
He died in 1624 and was buried at St Saviour's Church, York. His mural monument survives in York Minster.

References

1555 births
1624 deaths
High Sheriffs of Yorkshire
English MPs 1586–1587
English MPs 1589
English MPs 1593
English MPs 1597–1598
English MPs 1601
Alumni of Jesus College, Cambridge
People from Easingwold
Baronets in the Baronetage of England